Tanypodini is a tribe of midges in the non-biting midge family (Chironomidae).

Genera & species
Genus Tanypus Meigen, 1803
T. kraatzi (Kieffer, 1912)
T. punctipennis Meigen, 1818
T. vilipennis (Kieffer, 1918)

References

Tanypodinae
Nematocera tribes